Mateo Sebastian Aramburu Birch (born 10 March 1998) is a Uruguayan professional footballer who plays as a forward.

Club career

Early career
Born in Guatemala City to an English mother and a Uruguayan father, Aramburu started playing for Comunicaciones FC youth ranks in Guatemala. He joined Defensor Sporting in Uruguay in 2015, where he signed his first 3 year professional contract. At age 19, he moved to Argentina to represent Huracán. In 2019, he played 1 season in his mother's home country, England, for Barnsley.

TOP Oss
In early 2020, he went on trial with Dutch club Den Bosch where he would have signed if not for the COVID-19 pandemic affecting all professional football. He then moved to TOP Oss in the summer of 2020,<ref
 name="futbolcentroamerica1"></ref> and made his debut for the club as a starter on 5 September in a 3–0 away loss to Roda JC Kerkrade.

Wuppertaler SV
On 1 February 2021, Aramburu signed with Regionalliga club Wuppertaler SV after a successful trial. He made his debut on 24 February in a 1–0 win over Alemannia Aachen, coming on as a substitute in the 80th minute. On 6 March, he scored his first senior goal in a 2–0 win over Schalke 04 II, a game in which he also provided an assist.

Schalke 04 II
On 14 June 2021, it was announced that Aramburu had signed with Schalke 04, joining their reserve team.

References 

1998 births
Living people
Uruguayan expatriate footballers
Guatemalan expatriate footballers
Sportspeople from Guatemala City
Defensor Sporting players
Club Atlético Huracán footballers
Barnsley F.C. players
Championnat National 3 players
Eerste Divisie players
Regionalliga players
TOP Oss players
Wuppertaler SV players
FC Schalke 04 II players
Association football forwards
Uruguayan expatriate sportspeople in Argentina
Uruguayan expatriate sportspeople in England
Uruguayan expatriate sportspeople in France
Uruguayan expatriate sportspeople in the Netherlands
Uruguayan expatriate sportspeople in Germany
Expatriate footballers in Argentina
Expatriate footballers in England
Expatriate footballers in France
Expatriate footballers in the Netherlands
Expatriate footballers in Germany
Uruguayan people of English descent
Guatemalan people of Uruguayan descent
Guatemalan people of English descent
Comunicaciones F.C. players